Guru Nanak Foundation Public School is a higher-secondary co-education private school in the Patiala, Punjab, India. The school was started  on 14 April 1993 by Guru Nanak Foundation and is affiliated to the Central Board of Secondary Education of India, with affiliation code 1630120.School has udise code 03170514004.

References 

Co-educational schools in India
High schools and secondary schools in Patiala
Educational institutions established in 2001
2001 establishments in Punjab, India